The 12 Hours of Sebring Grand Prix of Endurance, was the third round of the 1986 IMSA GT Championship and was held at the Sebring International Raceway, on March 22, 1986. Victory overall went to the No. 5 Bob Akin Motor Racing Porsche 962 driven by Bob Akin, Hans-Joachim Stuck, and Jo Gartner.

Race results
Class winners in bold.

Class Winners

References

IMSA GTP
12 Hours of Sebring
12 Hours of Sebring
Sebring
12 Hours of Sebring